Digital public goods are public goods in the form of software, data sets, AI models, standards or content that are generally free cultural works and contribute to sustainable national and international digital development.

Use of the term "digital public good" appears as early as April 2017, when Nicholas Gruen wrote Building the Public Goods of the Twenty-First Century, and has gained popularity with the growing recognition of the potential for new technologies to be implemented at a national scale to better service delivery to citizens. Digital technologies have also been identified by countries, NGOs and private sector entities as a means to achieve the Sustainable Development Goals (SDGs). This translation of public goods onto digital platforms has resulted in the use of the term "digital public goods".

Several international agencies, including UNICEF and UNDP, are exploring DPGs as a possible solution to address the issue of digital inclusion, particularly for children in emerging economies.

Definition

A digital public good is defined by the UN Secretary-General’s Roadmap for Digital Cooperation, as: "open source software, open data, open AI models, open standards and open content that adhere to privacy and other applicable laws and best practices, do no harm, and help attain the SDGs."

Most physical resources exist in limited supply. When a resource is removed and used, the supply becomes scarce or depleted. Scarcity can result in competing rivalry for the resource. The nondepletable, nonexclusive, and nonrivalrous nature of digital public goods means the rules and norms for managing them can be different from how physical public goods are managed. Digital public goods can be infinitely stored, copied, and distributed without becoming depleted, and at close to zero cost. Abundance rather than scarcity is an inherent characteristic of digital resources in the digital commons.

Digital public goods share some traits with public goods including non-rivalry and non-excludability.

Usage

This Wikimania submission from 2019 shows how the definition of a public good evolves into a digital public good:A public good is a good that is both non-excludable (no one can be prevented from consuming this good) and non-rivalrous (the consumption of this good by anyone does not reduce the quantity available to others). Extending this definition to global public goods, they become goods with benefits that extend to all countries, people, and generations and are available across national borders everywhere. Knowledge and information goods embody global public goods when provided for free (otherwise the trait of non-excludability could not be met on the basis of excluding those who cannot pay for those goods). The online world provides a great medium for the provision of global public goods, where they become global digital public goods. Once produced in their digital form, global public goods are essentially costless to replicate and make available to all, under the assumption that users have Internet connectivity to access these goods.

Examples

In sectors from information science, education, finance, healthcare and beyond there are relevant examples of technologies that are likely to be digital public goods as defined above.

One such example is Wikipedia itself. Others include DHIS2, an open source health management system.

Free and open-source software (FOSS) is an example of digital public good. Since FOSS is licensed to allow it to be shared freely, modified and redistributed, it  is available as a digital public good.

Another example of digital public good is open educational resources, which by their copyright are allowed to be freely re-used, revised and shared.

Free and open-source software 
While the original motivation of the free software movement, was political in nature - aiming to preserve the freedom of  all to study, copy, modify and re-distribute any software/code, given that the marginal costs of duplication of software is negligible, FOSS becomes digital public good.

FOSS has allowed greater dissemination of software in society. Since FOSS applications can be customized, users can add local language interfaces (localization), which expands the availability of the digital public good to more in that country/society/region, where users speak that language.

Open educational resources
Copyright law makes the default copyright as 'all rights reserved', this applies to digital content as well. The open educational resources (OER) movement has popularized the use of copyright ('copyleft') licenses like the Creative Commons, which allows the content to be freely re-used, shared, modified and re-distributed. Thus all OER are digital public goods. OER have reduced the costs of accessing learning materials in schools and higher education institutions in many countries of the world. In India, the Ministry of Education has supported the development of the DIKSHA OER portal for teachers to upload and download materials for their teaching-learning.

OER itself is an output of using editing/authoring software applications. The Commonwealth of Learning, a Commonwealth inter-governmental institution, has been popularizing the use of FOSS editors to create OER, and has supported IT for Change to develop the Teachers' toolkit for creating and re-purposing OER using FOSS. Such an approach will lead to expansion in one digital public  good (content or OER), using another digital public good FOSS.

Open data

Digital public goods as defined by the UN Secretary-General’s High-level Panel on Digital Cooperation published in The Age of Digital Interdependence includes open data.

Beginning with open data in a machine readable format, startups and enterprises can build applications and services that utilize that data. This can create interoperability at a large scale.

The UNCTAD Digital Economy Report 2019 recommends commissioning the private sector to build the necessary infrastructure for extracting data, which can be stored in a public data fund that is part of the national data commons. Alternative solutions include mandating companies through public procurement contracts to provide data they collect to governments (this is being tested in Barcelona, for example).

Digital Public Goods Alliance

In mid-2019 the UN Secretary-General’s High-level Panel on Digital Cooperation published The Age of Digital Interdependence. The report recommended advancing a global discussion about how stakeholders could work better together to realize the potential of digital technologies for advancing human well-being. Recommendation 1B in that report states "that a broad, multi-stakeholder alliance, involving the UN, create a platform for sharing digital public goods, engaging talent and pooling data sets, in a manner that respects privacy, in areas related to attaining the SDGs".

In response, in late 2019 the Governments of Norway and Sierra Leone, UNICEF and iSPIRT formally initiated the Digital Public Goods Alliance as a follow-up on the High-level Panel.

The subsequent UN Secretary-General’s Roadmap for Digital Cooperation, published in June 2020, mentions the Digital Public Goods Alliance specifically as "a multi-stake-holder initiative responding directly to the lack of a "go to" platform, as highlighted by the Panel in its report." The report further highlights digital public goods as essential to achieving the Sustainable Development Goals in low- and middle-income countries and calls on all stakeholders, including the UN to assist in their development and implementation.

See also

 Global commons
 Global public good
 Public infrastructure

References 

Open-source movement
Open educational resources